John Andrew Bowler (March 1, 1862 – October 7, 1935) was an American educator and Baptist minister. He was the first minister of the Mt. Olivet Baptist Church in Richmond, Virginia and was one of the organizers for the first school for African Americans in Church Hill. He died on October 7, 1935, and is buried in the historic Evergreen Cemetery in Richmond, Virginia.

The former Springfield School on Twenty Six Street in Richmond was renamed in his honor.

His former students include Delegate James S. Christian, Jr., who described Bowler as an "outstanding teacher".

References

External links
 Mt. Olivet Baptist Church (Richmond, Virginia)

1862 births
1935 deaths
African-American Baptist ministers
20th-century Baptist ministers from the United States
20th-century African-American people